The Chaos Code is a 2007 science-fiction/fantasy novel for young teenagers by British author Justin Richards.

The novel won the Hull Children's Book Award in 2008.

Synopsis
Matt Stribling, a 15-year-old boy on holiday from boarding school, finds his archaeologist father missing under mysterious circumstances. He discovers that his father has been working on an ancient code which may have caused the downfall of ancient civilizations. Now a madman has the code and wants to use it to dominate the universe.

Reception
Publishers Weekly gave the book a mixed review, praising its action, but criticizing its shallow characters and implausible events. Kirkus Reviews was more positive, stating that the book "will capture the reader’s attention and keep them turning pages long after lights out."

References

2007 British novels
2007 children's books
2007 fantasy novels
2007 science fiction novels
British science fiction novels
Children's science fiction novels
Children's fantasy novels
British children's novels
Faber and Faber books